is one of the two  of Kodokan Judo. It is intended as an illustration of the various concepts of  that exist in judo, and is used both as a training method and as a demonstration of understanding.

History

The nage-no-kata was developed by Jigoro Kano as a method of illustrating principles of throwing to allow students to more effectively apply them in randori. Initially the kata consisted of ten techniques. These were subsequently appended with the addition of a further five throws, including kata guruma and uki otoshi.

Description

The kata is composed of 3 techniques each from the five classifications of throw in judo: 

Each of these 15 techniques is performed twice in the specified order, both right and left handed. The kata is generally performed in a strictly formalised manner with clearly defined .

Tori and Uke step in, left foot first, to adopt .

Tori approaches Uke using . Tori and Uke grip using a standard right-handed sleeve-lapel grip. Uke initiates by stepping forward using  into . Tori responds by stepping backwards (tsugi ashi). Uke's balance is compromised and he attempts to regain the advantage by stepping forward again and Tori again responds by stepping backwards, further unbalancing Uke. On Uke's second attempt to regain his balance (i.e. his third step forward), Tori breaks rhythm, dropping to his left knee, and throws Uke to his rear, pulling with a steering motion.

Tori and Uke return to their feet and repeat the technique in the opposite (i.e. left-handed) orientation.

 Seoi nage (背負投) - shoulder throw

Uke approaches tori, steps forward with the right foot and raises the right hand as a hammer fist to strike directly on the top of tori's head. This works better if uke uses some power and momentum to strike. Tori allows the blow to begin to fall. Tori steps around 180 degrees, grabs (pulls) uke's right arm to continue to allow uke's momentum to follow forward (Tori does not deflect the blow!). The forward momentum of uke's blow makes uke fall onto tori's back (kuzushi). At the same time tori is ready to receive uke on his back and turns his shoulders and body while maintaining grip of the arm, redirecting the forward energy of the fall (and of uke) to the ground.

Tori and Uke return to their feet and repeat the technique in the opposite left-handed orientation.

 Kata guruma (肩車) - shoulder wheel

Tori approachesUke's side, and receives the attack of Uke, which is the standard grip, explained previously, named Kumi kata (組方, fundamental grip) and pushing against uke. Tori follow the force of Uke and make the first step backwards, as did in the past throws. In the second step, Tori

Koshi-waza (hip techniques)
Uki goshi (浮腰) - floating hip throw
Harai goshi (払腰) - sweeping hip throw
Tsurikomi goshi (釣込腰) - lifting/pulling hip throw

Ashi-waza (foot techniques)
Okuriashi harai (送足払) - sliding foot sweep
Sasae tsurikomi ashi (支釣込足) - Propping and drawing ankle throw
Uchi mata (内股) - inner thigh throw

Ma-sutemi-waza (rear sacrifice techniques)
Tomoe nage (巴投) - circle throw
Ura nage (裏投) - rear throw
Sumi gaeshi (隅返) - corner reversal

Yoko-sutemi-waza (side sacrifice techniques)
Yoko gake (横掛) - side hook
Yoko guruma (横車) - side wheel
Uki waza (浮技) - floating technique

References

External links 
 Judo Information Site. Nage no Kata instruction and links
Nage No Kata Instructional Video
 A demonstration at the Kodokan.  Tori: Dohba Yoshihisa Uke: Nishimoto Nimoru

Judo kata
Throw (grappling)